Maitreya or Metteyya, also Maitreya Buddha or Metteyya Buddha, is regarded as the future Buddha of this world in Buddhist eschatology. As the 5th and final Buddha of the current kalpa, Maitreya's teachings will be aimed at reinstating the dharma, a vital concept in Hinduism, Buddhism, Sikhism and Jainism. In all branches of Buddhism, he is viewed as the direct successor of Gautama Buddha. In some Buddhist literature, such as the Amitabha Sutra and the Lotus Sutra, he is referred to as Ajita. Despite many religious figures and spiritual leaders claiming to be Maitreya throughout history, all Buddhists firmly agree that these were false claims, indicating that Maitreya, the Buddha of the Future, is yet to appear.

According to Buddhist tradition, Maitreya is a bodhisattva who is prophesied to appear on Earth, achieve complete Enlightenment, and teach the Dharma. According to scriptures, Maitreya's teachings will be similar to those of Gautama Buddha (also known as Śākyamuni Buddha). The arrival of Maitreya is prophesied to occur during an era when the teachings of Gautama Buddha have been forgotten by most of the terrestrial world.

Maitreya, in Buddhist tradition, presently resides in Tushita heaven. Maitreya is the earliest bodhisattva around whom a cult developed and is mentioned in scriptures from the 3rd century CE. Maitreya has also been employed in a millenarian role by many non-Buddhist religions in the past, such as Theosophy, the White Lotus, as well as by modern new religious movements, such as Yiguandao.

Sources
The name Maitreya is derived from the Sanskrit word maitrī "friendship", which is in turn derived from the noun mitra "friend". The Pali form Metteyya is mentioned in the Cakkavatti-Sīhanāda Sutta (Digha Nikaya 26) of the Pāli Canon, and also in chapter 28 of the Buddhavamsa. Most of the Buddha's sermons are presented as having been presented in answer to a question, or in some other appropriate context, but this sutta has a beginning and ending in which the Buddha is talking to monks about something totally different. This leads scholar Richard Gombrich to conclude that either the whole sutta is apocryphal or that it has at least been tampered with.

In the Greco-Buddhist art of Gandhara, in the first centuries CE in northern India, Maitreya was the most popular figure to be represented along with Gautama Buddha (often called Śākyamuni "sage of the Shakya"). In 4th to 6th-century China, "Buddhist artisans used the names Shakyamuni and Maitreya interchangeably... indicating both that the distinction between the two had not yet been drawn and that their respective iconographies had not yet been firmly set". An example is the stone sculpture found in the Qingzhou cache dedicated to Maitreya in 529 CE as recorded in the inscription (currently in the Qingzhou Museum, Shandong). The religious belief of Maitreya apparently developed around the same time as that of Amitābha, as early as the 3rd century CE.

Characteristics
It implies that Maitreya is a teacher of meditative trance sādhanā and states that gods, men and other beings:

General description
In the Greco-Buddhist art of Gandhara, Maitreya is represented as a northern Indian nobleman, holding a kumbha in his left hand. Sometimes this is a "wisdom urn" (Tibetan: Bumpa). He is flanked by his two acolytes, the brothers Asanga and Vasubandhu, who founded the Yogacara tradition.

The Maitreyasamiti was an extensive Buddhist play in pre-Islamic Central
Asia. The Maitreyavyakarana (in Sataka form) in Central Asia and the Anagatavamsa of South India also mention him.

Maitreya's  Heaven
Maitreya currently resides in the  Heaven (Pāli: Tusita), said to be reachable through meditation. Gautama Buddha also lived here before he was born into the world as all bodhisattvas live in the  Heaven before they descend to the human realm to become Buddhas. Although all bodhisattvas are destined to become Buddhas, the concept of a bodhisattva differs greatly in Theravada and Mahayana Buddhism. In Theravada Buddhism, a bodhisattva is one who is striving for full enlightenment (Arahantship in Pali), whereas in Mahayana Buddhism, a bodhisattva is one who vows to achieve enlightenment for the purpose of helping all sentient beings (a common misconception being that they delay their enlightenment, which is inaccurate according to the Nalanda tradition).

In Mahayana Buddhism, Buddhas preside over pure lands, such as Amitābha over Sukhavati. Once Maitreya becomes a buddha, he will rule over the Ketumati pure land, an earthly paradise sometimes associated with the city of Varanasi (also known as Benares) in Uttar Pradesh, India, and in other descriptions, the Shambhala.

In Theravada Buddhism, Buddhas are born as unenlightened humans, and are not rulers of any paradise or pure land. Maitreya's arising would be no different from the arising of Gautama Buddha, as he achieved full enlightenment as a human being and died, entering parinibbana (nirvana-after-death).

Activity of Maitreya in the current age

In Mahayana schools, Maitreya is traditionally said to have revealed the Five Treatises of Maitreya through Asanga. These texts are the basis of the Yogacara tradition and constitute the majority of the third turning within the Three Turnings of the Wheel of Dharma.

Future coming of Maitreya

According to Buddhist tradition, each kalpa has 1,000 Buddhas. The previous kalpa was the vyuhakalpa (Glorious aeon), and the present kalpa is called the bhadrakalpa (Auspicious aeon). The Seven Buddhas of Antiquity (Saptatathāgata) are seven Buddhas which bridge the vyuhakalpa and the bhadrakalpa:
Vipassī (the 998th Buddha of the vyuhakalpa)
Sikhī (the 999th Buddha of the vyuhakalpa)
Vessabhū (the 1000th and final Buddha of the vyuhakalpa)
Kakusandha (the first Buddha of the bhadrakalpa)
Koṇāgamana (the second Buddha of the bhadrakalpa)
Kassapa (the third Buddha of the bhadrakalpa)
Gautama (the fourth and present Buddha of the bhadrakalpa)
Maitreya will be the fifth and future Buddha of the bhadrakalpa, and his arrival will occur after the teachings of Gautama Buddha are no longer practiced.

The coming of Maitreya will be characterized by a number of physical events. The oceans are predicted to decrease in size, allowing Maitreya to traverse them freely. Maitreya will then reintroduce true dharma to the world.

Maitreya's arrival will signify the end of the middle time, the time between the fourth Buddha, Gautama Buddha, and the fifth Buddha, Maitreya, which is viewed as a low point of human existence. According to the Cakkavatti Sutta: The Wheel-turning Emperor, Digha Nikaya 26 of the Sutta Pitaka of the Pāli Canon, Maitreya Buddha will be born in a time when humans will live to an age of eighty thousand years, in the city of Ketumatī (present Varanasi), whose king will be the Cakkavattī Sankha. Sankha will live in the palace where once dwelt King Mahāpanadā, but later he will give the palace away and will himself become a follower of Maitreya Buddha.

The scriptures say that Maitreya will attain bodhi in seven days (which is the minimum period), by virtue of his many lives of preparation for buddhahood similar to those reported in the Jataka tales.

At this time a notable teaching he will start giving is that of the ten non-virtuous deeds (killing, stealing, sexual misconduct, lying, divisive speech, abusive speech, idle speech, covetousness, harmful intent and wrong views) and the ten virtuous deeds (the abandonment of: killing, stealing, sexual misconduct, lying, divisive speech, abusive speech, idle speech, covetousness, harmful intent and wrong views).

The Arya Maitreya Mandala, an order founded by Anagarika Govinda, is based on the idea of the future coming of Maitreya.

Buddhist texts from several traditions say that beings in Maitreya's time will be much bigger than during the time of Sakyamuni. In one prophecy his disciples are contemptuous of Mahakasyapa, whose head is no larger than an insect to them. Buddha's robe barely covers two fingers making them wonder how tiny Buddha was. Mahākāśyapa is said to be small enough in comparison to cremate in the palm of Maitreya's hand.

Foretold biography 
Maitreya will be born to the Brahmins, Tubrahmā (father) and Brahmavadi (mother) in Ketumatī, which will be ruled by King Saṅkha, a Chakravarti. Maitreya's spouse will be Princess Sandamukkhī. His son will be Brahmavaṁsa. After the birth of his son, Maitreya will leave to practice asceticism. He will practice for 7 days. After the practice, he will be awakened under a Mesua ferrea tree. The disciples of Maitreya Buddha are:
Asoka, an Agraśrāvaka and the right-hand chief disciple
Brahmadeva, an Agraśrāvaka and the left-hand chief disciple
Sumana, the right-hand Agasāvikā
Padumā, the left-hand Agasāvikā
Sīha, a primary attendant.

Maitreya will be 88 cubits (132 feet, 40 meters) tall and will live for 88,000 years. Like Maṅgala Buddha, his rays will make people hard to distinguish between day and night. His teachings will preserve for the next 180,000 years. According to the commentary of Anāgatavamsa, his teaching will last for 360,000 years.

Nichiren Buddhism and Maitreya as metaphor

According to the Lotus Sutra in Nichiren Buddhism, all people possess the potential to reveal an innate Buddha nature during their own lifetimes, a concept which may appear to contradict the idea of Buddha as savior or messiah.

Although Maitreya is a significant figure in the Lotus Sutra, the explanation of Nichiren is that Maitreya is a metaphor of stewardship and aid for the Bodhisattvas of the Earth, as written in the Lotus Sutra:
 In much of his writing, Nichiren mentions the traditional Buddhist views on Maitreya but explains that the propagation of the Eternal Dharma of the Lotus Sutra was entrusted by Shakyamuni to the Bodhisattvas of earth:  Thus, each individual can embody the character of the Maitreya because he is a metaphor for compassion:

Maitreya claimants

The following list is just a small selection of those people who claimed or claim to be the incarnation of Maitreya. Many have either used the Maitreya incarnation claim to form a new Buddhist sect or have used the name of Maitreya to form a new religious movement or cult.
 In 613 the monk Xiang Haiming claimed himself Maitreya and adopted an imperial title.
 In 690 Wu Zetian, empress regnant of the Wu Zhou interregnum (690–705), proclaimed herself an incarnation of the future Buddha Maitreya, and made Luoyang the "holy capital." In 693 she temporarily replaced the compulsory Dao De Jing in the curriculum with her own Rules for Officials.
Gung Ye, a Korean warlord and king of the short-lived state of Taebong during the 10th century, claimed himself as the living incarnation of Maitreya and ordered his subjects to worship him. His claim was widely rejected by most Buddhist monks and later he was dethroned and killed by his own servants.
 Bahá’u’lláh (1817–1892), the Prophet-Founder of the Bahá’í Faith, is recognized by Bahá’ís as the promised Maitreya Buddha and Promised One of all religions.
 Lu Zhongyi (1849-1925), the 17th patriarch of Yiguandao, claimed to be an incarnation of Maitreya.
 L. Ron Hubbard, founder of the belief systems Dianetics and Scientology, suggested he was "Metteya" (Maitreya) in the 1955 poem Hymn of Asia. Numerous editors and followers of Hubbard claim that in the book's preface, specific physical characteristics said to be outlined—in unnamed Sanskrit sources—as properties of the coming Maitreya were properties with which Hubbard's appearance supposedly aligned.
 Samael Aun Weor (1917–1977) – stated in The Aquarian Message that "the Maitreya Buddha Samael is the Kalki Avatar of the New Age." The Kalkian Avatar and Maitreya Buddha, he claimed, are the same "White Rider" of the Book of Revelation.
 Adi Da was suggested by his devotees to be Maitreya: 
 Followers of B.R. Ambedkar in the Dalit Buddhist Movement regard him as a bodhisattva, the Maitreya, although he never claimed it himself.
 Many scholars and analysts claimed Hindu Avatar Kalki as Maitreya.
 Some Muslim writers, including those of the Ahmadiyya Muslim Community, claimed Islamic prophet Muhammad as Maitreya.

Maitreya sects in China

Pre-Maitreyan Buddhist messianic rebellions

Southern and Northern Dynasties
 515: The 'Chinese Rebellion'. In the late summer of that year, the renegade monk Faqing 法慶 married a nun and formed a sect in the Northern Wei province of Jizhou 冀州 (in the southern part of today's Hebei province) with the assistance of a local aristocrat named Li Guibo 李歸伯. Li Guibo was given the titles of Tenth-stage Bodhisattva, Commander of the Demon-vanquishing Army, and King who Pacifies the Land of Han by Faqing.

Using drugs to send its members into a killing frenzy, and promoting them to Tenth-Stage Bodhisattva as soon as they killed ten enemies, the sect seized a prefecture and murdered all the government officials in it. Their slogan was "A new Buddha has entered the world; eradicate the demons of the former age", and they would kill all monks and nuns in the monasteries that they captured, also burning all the sutras and icons. After defeating a government army and growing to a size of over 50,000, the rebel army was finally crushed by another government army of 100,000. Faqing, his wife, and tens of thousands of his followers were beheaded, and Li Guibo was also captured later and publicly executed in the capital city Luoyang.

The Fozu Tongji (Comprehensive Records of the Buddha), a chronicle of Buddhist history written by the monk Zhipan in 1269, also contains an account of the Rebellion, but with significant deviations from the original account, such as dating the rebellion to 528 rather than 515.

 516: The Moonlight Child Rebellion. Toward the end of that year, another sect was discovered by local authorities in Yanling, Jizhou. A man named Fa Quan and his associates were claiming that an eight-year-old child Liu Jinghui was a Bodhisattva called the Moonlight Child (yueguang tongzi pusa； 月光童子菩萨), and that he could transform into a snake or a pheasant. They were arrested and sentenced to death on suspicion of seditious intent, but Jinghui had his sentence commuted to banishment on account of his youth and ignorance.
 517: Early in the spring of that year, surviving remnants of the rebels regrouped and mounted a sudden attack on the capital of Yingzhou province, which lay just northwest of their original base in Bohai prefecture. They were repelled only after a pitched battle with an army of slaves and attendants led by Yuwen Yan, the son of the provincial governor, and nothing more is known of their fate.

Although a "new Buddha" was mentioned, these rebellions are not considered "Maitreyan" by modern scholars. However, they would be a later influence on the rebel religious leaders that made such claims. Therefore, it is important to mention these rebellions in this context.

Maitreyan rebellions

Sui Dynasty
 610: On the first day of the Chinese New Year, dozens of rebels dressed in white, burning incense and holding flowers proclaimed their leader as Maitreya Buddha and charged into the imperial palace through one of its gates, killing all the guards before they were themselves killed by troops led by an imperial prince. A massive investigation in the capital (Chang'an) implicated over a thousand families.
 613: A skilled magician named Song Zixian claimed to be Maitreya in Tang County (northwest of Yingzhou), and allegedly could transform into the form of a Buddha and make his room emit a glow every night. He hung a mirror in a hall that could display an image of what a devotee would be reincarnated as: a snake, a beast or a human being. Nearly a thousand "from near and far" joined his sect every day, and he plotted to first hold a Buddhist vegetarian banquet, or wuzhe fohui, and then attack the emperor who was then touring Yingzhou. The plot was leaked, and Song was arrested and executed, along with over a thousand families of his followers.
 613: The monk Xiang Haiming claimed to be Maitreya in Fufeng prefecture (western Shaanxi) and led a rebellion. The elite of the Chang’an area hailed him as dasheng, or holy man, because they had auspicious dreams after following him, and his army swelled to several tens of thousands before he was defeated by government troops.

Tang Dynasty
 710: Wang Huaigu declared, "The Shakyamuni Buddha has declined; a new Buddha is about to appear. The House of Li is ending, and the House of Liu is about to rise".

Song Dynasty
 1047: Army officer Wang Ze led a revolt of Buddhists expecting Maitreya; they took over the city of Beizhou in Hebei before they were crushed. The Song Dynasty government declared Maitreya Sects to be "heresies and unsanctioned religions". Tens of thousands of Maitreya Sect followers were killed.

Yuan and Ming Dynasty
 1351: The Red Turban Rebellion (aka The First White Lotus Rebellion). Han Shantong (韓山童), leader of the White Lotus Society, and Army Commander Liu Futong rebelled against the Mongols of the Yuan dynasty. Shantong's anti-Mongol slogan was "The empire is in utter chaos. Maitreya Buddha has incarnated, and the Manichaean King of Light has appeared in this world."
 In 1355, Han Shantong's son, Han Lin'er (1355–1368?), was proclaimed "Emperor of the Great [Latter] Song" (大宋, referring to the defunct Song dynasty) by Liu Futong. Liu Futong claimed Han Lin'er was a direct descendant of the Zhao royal family who ruled the Song Dynasty. After Liu Futong's death, Zhu Yuanzhang took up command of the Red Turban Rebellion and later assassinated Han Lin'er to become the Hongwu Emperor of the Ming dynasty. (See History) According to Beijing University,

This suggests that the Ming dynasty was named after the White Lotus figures of the "Big and Little Bright Kings".

Qing Dynasty
 1796: The White Lotus Rebellion (aka The Second White Lotus Rebellion). It broke out among impoverished settlers in the mountainous region that separates Sichuan province from Hubei and Shaanxi provinces. It apparently began as a White Lotus Society protest against heavy taxes imposed by Manchu rulers of the Qing Dynasty.

The Yi He Tuan (義和團), often called in English the "Society of Harmonious Fists" was a 19th-century martial-sect inspired in part by the White Lotus Society. Members of the "Harmonious Fists" became known as "Boxers" in the west because they practiced Chinese martial arts.

 1899: The Boxer Rebellion (義和團之亂). Chinese rebellion from November 1899 to September 7, 1901, against foreign influence in such areas as trade, politics, religion and technology that occurred in China during the final years of the Qing Dynasty. By August 1900, over 230 foreigners, tens of thousands of Chinese Christians, an unknown number of rebels, their sympathizers and other innocent bystanders had been killed in the chaos. The uprising crumbled on August 14, 1900, when 20,000 foreign troops entered the Chinese capital, Peking (Beijing).

Albeit not in the name of Maitreya, both rebellions were perpetrated solely or in part by the White Lotus Society, a rebellious Maitreya sect.

Speculation
Some have speculated that inspiration for Maitreya may have come from Mithra, the ancient Indo-Iranian deity. The primary comparison between the two characters appears to be the similarity of their names, while a secondary comparison is that both were expected to come in the future.

Paul Williams claims that some Zoroastrian ideas like Saoshyant influenced the beliefs about Maitreya, such as "expectations of a heavenly helper, the need to opt for positive righteousness, the future millennium, and universal salvation". Possible objections are that these characteristics are not unique to Zoroastrianism, nor are they necessarily characteristic of the belief in Maitreya.

It is also possible that Maitreya Buddha originated with the Hindu Kalki, and that its similarities with the Iranian Mithra have to do with their common Indo-Iranian origin.

Non-Buddhist views

Theosophy

In Theosophy, the Maitreya (or Lord Maitreya) has multiple aspects signifying not just the future Buddha, but similar concepts from other religious or spiritual traditions.

In early 20th century, leading Theosophists became convinced that an appearance of the Maitreya as a "World Teacher" was imminent. A South Indian boy, Jiddu Krishnamurti, was thought to be destined as the "vehicle" of the soon-to-manifest Maitreya; however the manifestation did not happen as predicted, and did not fulfil Theosophists' expectations.

Post-theosophical movements
Since the growth of the theosophical movement in the 19th century, and influenced by theosophy's articulations on the Maitreya, non-Buddhist religious and spiritual movements have adopted and reinterpreted the concept in their doctrines. Share International, which equates Maitreya with the prophesied figures of multiple religious traditions, claims that he is already present in the world, but is preparing to make an open declaration of his presence in the near future. They claim that he is here to inspire mankind to create a new era based on sharing and justice.

In the beginning of the 1930s, the Ascended Master Teachings placed Maitreya in the "Office of World Teacher" until 1956, when he was described as moving on to the "Office of Planetary Buddha" and "Cosmic Christ" in their concept of a Spiritual Hierarchy.

In 1911, Rudolf Steiner claimed "Roughly three thousand years after our time the world will experience the Maitreya Buddha incarnation, which will be the last incarnation of Jeshu ben Pandira. This Bodhisattva, who will come as Maitreya Buddha, will also come in a physical body in our century in his reincarnation in the flesh — but not as Buddha — and he will make it his task to give humanity all the true concepts about the Christ Event." Steiner is careful to distinguish Jeshu ben Pandira as somebody entirely distinct from Jesus of Nazareth, as the Maitreya is entirely distinct from the Christ being. The Maitreya does work in support of the Christ being, as does Gautama, the current Buddha.

Ahmadiyya
The Ahmadiyyas believe Mirza Ghulam Ahmad (1835–1908) fulfilled expectations regarding the Maitreya Buddha.
The founder has given the whole account about the truth of forthcoming of Jesus Christ and his travel via Tibet & the transformation of word “Masiha” to “Metteyya” in one of his Prolific writings “Jesus in India” (Maseeh Hindustan Mai).

Baháʼí Faith 

Followers of the Baháʼí Faith believe that Bahá'u'lláh is the fulfillment of the prophecy of appearance of Maitreya, the fifth Buddha. Baháʼís believe that the prophecy that Maitreya will usher in a new society of tolerance and love has been fulfilled by Bahá'u'lláh's teachings on world peace.

Islam 
Islamic prophet Dhu al-Kifl has been identified with the Buddha based on Surah 95:1 of the Qur'an, which references a fig tree – a symbol that does not feature prominently in the lives of any of the other prophets mentioned in the Qur'an. It has meanwhile been suggested that the name Al-Kifl could be a reference to Kapilavastu, the home of Siddartha Gautama as a boy. On the other hand, some of the preachers of Islam cite Buddhist sources to claim that "Maitreya" refers to Islamic Prophet Muhammad. The Muslim Times website, for example, cites The Gospel of Buddha by Carus with the following quote of Buddha:

Korean shamanism

In many East Asian folk religions, including Korean shamanism, a deity by the name of Maitreya appears as an ancient creator god or goddess. A malevolent usurper deity by the name of Shakyamuni (the historical Buddha) claims dominion over Maitreya's world, and the two engage in a flower-growing contest to decide who will rule the world. Maitreya grows the flower while Shakyamuni cannot, but the usurper steals it while the creator sleeps. Shakyamuni thus becomes the ruler of the world and brings suffering and evil to the world.

Gallery

See also
 Budai, a traditional manifestation of Maitreya
 Christ (title)
 Index of Buddhism-related articles
 Kalki
 Kalki Purana
 Leshan Giant Buddha
 Lord of Light
 Mahdi
 Maitreya (Benjamin Creme)
 Maitreya (Mahābhārata)
 Maitreya Project
 Maitreya (Theosophy)
 Messiah
 Paraclete
 Saoshyant
 Secular Buddhism
 Decline of Buddhism in the Indian subcontinent

Notes

Further reading
 
Mipham, Jamgon; Maitreya; Shenga, Khenpo; Dharmachakra Translation Committee, trans. (2013). Distinguishing Phenomena from Their Intrinsic Nature: Maitreya's Dharmadharmatavibhanga with Commentaries by Khenpo Shenga and Ju Mipham. Snow Lion. .
 Iida, Shōtarō; Goldston, Jane, trans. (2016). Descent of Maitreya Buddha and his Enlightenment, (Taishō Volume 14, Number 454), Bukkyo Dendo Kyokai.
Mipham, Jamgon; Maitreya; Dharmachakra Translation Committee, trans. (2021). Middle Beyond Extremes: Maitreya's Madhyantavibhaga with Commentaries by Khenpo Shenga and Ju Mipham. Snow Lion. .

External links

 The Maitreya Project, building a huge statue of Maitreya in Kushinagar, India 
 April 2010 Smithsonian Magazine Article 
 About the Future Buddha Ariya Ajita Metteyya
 The Story of the Coming Buddha: Ariya Metteyya
 The Jonang Dharma on Maitreya
 

 
Bodhisattvas
Buddhist eschatology
Sanskrit words and phrases
Messianism
Sinhalese Buddhist deities